Ian Axel (born March 28, 1985) is an American singer and songwriter. After becoming well-known with his song "This Is the New Year", he developed a solo career, eventually joining forces with long-time writing partner, Chad King, to form the duo band A Great Big World in 2012.

Career

Axel grew up in Fair Lawn, New Jersey. He graduated from Fair Lawn High School (Class of 2003). He then moved to Manhattan, attending NYU. In 2006, Axel began performing publicly as a solo act. His song "This Is The New Year" became well-known originally when iTunes selected it as a Discovery Download and for its video on YouTube. Later it was featured as the theme song for the MTV documentary series I Used to Be Fat, which premiered December 29, 2010.

Axel's album, named after the title single, was initially released in 2010 as a self-release, then released a second time in partnership with tinyOGRE Entertainment. The tinyOGRE version was released digitally on February 15, 2011 and on CD on April 12, 2011. Later "This Is The New Year" was used in the opening sequence of Garry Marshall's film New Year's Eve. The partnership with tinyOGRE ended when the company dissolved in December 2011.

In 2010, Axel's long-time writing partner, Chad King, began joining him on stage more frequently and in 2012 they formed the band A Great Big World. They rose to further prominence with worldwide hit "Say Something", particularly after recording it as a duet collaboration with Christina Aguilera. The duet peaked at number four on the Billboard Hot 100.

Axel's primary instrument is the piano. He is also known for playing a number of songs on the ukulele.

Notable appearances
He made his national television debut on the Rachael Ray show  and NPR said in their Song of the Day feature that he had “a voice that possesses the sweetness of youth, the stubbornness of a teenager and the swagger of a rock star.”

In April 2011, the song "Gone" was featured prominently in Episode 19 of Season 8 of One Tree Hill, titled "Where Not to Look for Freedom.". As part of Tom's Shoes "One Day Without Shoes" campaign to raise awareness for children's poverty, Ian Axel performed two songs live on an advertorial website created in cooperation with La Blogotheque.

In July 2011 Axel opened for Five for Fighting at the Alive at Five Concert Series in Stamford, Connecticut.

In August 2011 Axel and King opened for Matthew Morrison at the Beacon Theatre.

In January 2012 Axel and King were the musical guests at Amanda Stern's Happy Endings Music and Reading Series at Joe's Pub
On November 24, 2013, Axel performed at the American Music Awards with Christina Aguilera.

On January 31, 2013, "This Is The New Year" was the closing song on Glee'''s Season 4, Episode 12 titled "Naked".

Ian Axel also performed during the 2013 Victoria's Secret Fashion show.

Personal life
Axel was born to a Jewish family and had a bar mitzvah but is a secular Jew.

In May 2015, he announced his engagement to longtime girlfriend and dancer Lina Kent. The couple later married in April 2016.

In November 2016, Axel publicly announced that he and his wife were expecting their first child, a baby boy due to be born in May 2017.

Discography
Solo releases
2007: I'm On to You EP 
2011: This Is the New Year LP

in band A Great Big World
2012: A Great Big World EP
2014: Is There Anybody Out There? LP
2015: When the Morning Comes'' LP

References

External links 

Official website

1985 births
American male singer-songwriters
American rock singers
American rock songwriters
Grammy Award winners
Living people
Singer-songwriters from New Jersey
New York University alumni
Fair Lawn High School alumni
People from Fair Lawn, New Jersey
People from Alameda County, California
Singer-songwriters from California
21st-century American male singers
21st-century American singers